Touqiao Subdistrict is a subdistrict in Yunyan District of Guiyang, Guizhou, China. , it administers the following sixteen residential neighborhoods:
Qianchun
Tou'erqiao
Haima
Yinglie
Huangjin
Shuangfeng
Yanxi
Hongfu
Liuwan
Luohanying
Jinding
Songshan
Longcheng
Wuliu
Jingu
Beidi

See also 
 List of township-level divisions of Guizhou

References 

Subdistricts of Guizhou
Guiyang